Saint-Laurent-de-la-Salanque is a commune in the Pyrénées-Orientales department in southern France.

Geography 
Saint-Laurent-de-la-Salanque is located in the canton of La Côte Salanquaise and in the arrondissement of Perpignan.

Population

See also
Saint-Laurent-de-la-Salanque explosion
Communes of the Pyrénées-Orientales department

References

Communes of Pyrénées-Orientales